Gig Records is an independent US record label founded in 1998 that operates out of Point Pleasant, New Jersey. Composed mostly of rock bands, Gig Records' roster also includes electronic artists, singer/songwriters, punk bands, and a movie soundtrack. The label's most notable acts are: Miles Hunt of The Wonderstuff, Ned's Atomic Dustbin,  Blind Society, and The Vibrators.

History
In 1998, label President and co-founder Indian left TVT Records, then the largest independent US record label, to pursue his own label. After working in multiple facets of the music industry for more than a decade, Indian recruited partners David Smith, Ovid Battat, and Gorgo to form Gig Records.

Gig Records adopted the slogan "Doing Things Differently", and still operates on this principle. Implementing creative tactics to help drive artists to success is at the forefront of the Gig Records mantra, running closely with the intent to work for the artist instead of the artist working for the label. This unorthodox methodology of operation has helped Gig Records earn notoriety over the years as a label that nurtures and develops new and exciting artists.

Eat

Artists

Amazing Meet Project
Blind Society
Dead 50's
Dryer
Eat Eat (band)
Fight Of Your Life
Great Mutant Skywheel
Groundswell UK
Gum Parker
Love In Reverse
Michael Ferentino
Miles Hunt
Misty Murphy
Nebula 9
Ned's Atomic Dustbin
Pure 13
Red Engine Nine
Stephen Reso
Sunday All Stars
The Vibrators
Virginia
Weak At Best
The Youth Ahead

Soundtracks
A Better Place

References

External links 
 Gig Records Official Website 

American independent record labels
Companies based in Ocean County, New Jersey
1998 establishments in New Jersey